Ivan Maroz (born 5 October 1992) is a Belarusian handball player for Bnei Herzliya and the Belarusian national team.

References

External links

Belarusian male handball players
Expatriate handball players
Belarusian expatriate sportspeople in Hungary
Belarusian expatriate sportspeople in Ukraine
HC Motor Zaporizhia players
People from Gomel District
1992 births
Living people
Sportspeople from Gomel Region